The 2002–03 League of Ireland First Division season was the 18th season of the League of Ireland First Division. The First Division was contested by 12 teams. Waterford United won the title while Finn Harps won the First Division Cup, a one-off tournament staged this season.

Overview

First Division Cup
Between July and August the 12 teams competed in the First Division Cup. The teams were divided into two regionalised groups and played a single round of games. The two group winners then qualified for the final. On 6 July 2002 Kildare County, the First Division's newest members, made their competitive debut against Limerick at Station Road. Philip Gorman and Shey Zellor scored for County as they won 2–0. County went on to win their regional group and qualify for the final but lost 4–0 on aggregate to Finn Harps.

Final tables
Southern section

Northern section

Final

Finn Harps win 4–0 on aggregate.

Regular season
The regular season began in August  and concluded in January. It used a round-robin format which saw each team play 22 games. Under manager Jimmy McGeough and with a team that included Dan Connor, Waterford United won the title and were automatically promoted to the 2003 Premier Division.

Final table

Promotion/relegation play-off
The promotion/relegation play-off format was changed this season. It now featured four teams, the second, third and fourth placed teams from the First Division plus Drogheda United, the ninth placed team from the 2002–03 League of Ireland Premier Division.

Semi-finals
1st Legs

2nd Legs

Galway United win 2–1 on aggregate

Drogheda United win 4–2 on aggregate

Final

Drogheda United win 3–2 on aggregate and retain their place in the Premier Division.

See also
 2002–03 League of Ireland Premier Division

References

League of Ireland First Division seasons
2002–03 in Republic of Ireland association football
Ireland